This is a list of Asian cities and towns that have, or once had, town tramway (urban tramway, or streetcar) systems as part of their public transport system. A separate list has been created for Japan to increase user-friendliness and reduce article size.

Armenia

Azerbaijan

China

Georgia

Hong Kong

India

Indonesia

Iran

Iraq

Israel

Japan

Kazakhstan

Lebanon

Malaysia

Myanmar

North Korea

Pakistan

Philippines

Russia

Singapore

South Korea

Sri Lanka

Syria

Taiwan

Thailand

Turkey

United Arab Emirates

Uzbekistan

Vietnam

See also 

 List of town tramway systems in Africa
 List of town tramway systems in Central America
 List of town tramway systems in Europe
 List of town tramway systems in North America
 List of town tramway systems in Oceania
 List of town tramway systems in South America
 List of town tramway systems

 List of tram and light rail transit systems
 List of metro systems
 List of trolleybus systems

References

Tram transport-related lists
 
Tram